CLC-1 short-range surveillance radar is a ground-based mobile tracking radar used by the People's Liberation Army of China.

Installation and use

The CLC-1 radar is installed on the Type 95 (also known as PGZ-95) self-propelled anti-aircraft artillery (SPAA) system as the main search and acquisition radar. This system can operate while moving. It has very strong anti-clutter capacity, can acquire and track ultra-low altitude attacking targets and direct guns to counterattack effectively.

Manufacturer

The manufacturer of the system is Nanjing Research Institute of Electronics Technology (NRIET)/Nanjing Institute No. 1 /南京电子技术研究所.

Further features
 High mobility, typically vehicle mounted
 Fully coherent pulse-Doppler radar system
 Programmable signal processing
 CFAR, anti-ground clutter performance

External links
 NRIET

Ground radars
Military radars of the People's Republic of China
Military equipment introduced in the 1990s